Waldridge may refer to:

Waldridge, Buckinghamshire
Waldridge, County Durham